Justice Overton may refer to:

Ben Overton (1926–2012), associate justice of the Supreme Court of Florida
Winston Overton (1870–1934), associate justice of the Louisiana Supreme Court